Island ECN was one of the first electronic communication networks established for the trading equities in the United States. Founded in 1996 by Datek Securities veterans Jeff Citron and Joshua Levine, Island executed its first trades in 1997.

History
Prior to Island, Citron and Levine worked together at Datek Securities (now TD Ameritrade). Citron's background was in trading and Levine had experience with software development. While at Datek, they worked together to develop a software program called Watcher. Watcher was one of the first programs to provide real-time quote and electronic order capabilities for trading NASDAQ stocks through the small order execution system (SOES).

Later, Citron and Levine used their experience with Watcher to help develop Island ECN.

Instinet acquired Island Exchange in 2002 and renamed the trading platform as Inet.

References

Electronic trading platforms
2002 mergers and acquisitions